LaClede Township is one of twenty townships in Fayette County, Illinois, USA.  As of the 2010 census, its population was 909 and it contained 408 housing units.

LaClede Township was named for Pierre Laclede, the founder of St. Louis, Missouri.

Geography

Cities, towns, villages
 Farina (northeast three-quarters)

Unincorporated towns
 La Clede

Cemeteries
The township contains Farina Cemetery.

Major highways
  Interstate 57
  Illinois Route 185

Demographics

School districts
 Altamont Community Unit School District 10
 Effingham Community Unit School District 40
 South Central Community Unit School District 401

Political districts
 Illinois's 19th congressional district
 State House District 102
 State Senate District 51

References
 
 United States Census Bureau 2007 TIGER/Line Shapefiles
 United States National Atlas

External links
 City-Data.com
 Illinois State Archives

Townships in Fayette County, Illinois
Populated places established in 1859
Townships in Illinois
1859 establishments in Illinois